Farewell My Concubine is a 1985 novel by Lilian Lee (Li Bihua). The novel contains scenes not present in the film adaptation and scenes which had been altered in the film version. In 1993 Lee published a revised version of Farewell My Concubine, after the release of the film.

References
 Braester, Yomi. Contributors: Rey Chow, Harry Harootunian, Masao Miyoshi. Painting the City Red: Chinese Cinema and the Urban Contract (Asia-Pacific: Culture, Politics, and Society). Duke University Press, March 17, 2010. , 9780822392750.

Notes

1985 novels
20th-century Chinese novels
Chinese novels adapted into films
Novels by Lilian Lee
Fiction about Chinese opera